Waldsee is a municipality in the Rhein-Pfalz-Kreis, in Rhineland-Palatinate, Germany.

It is situated approximately 3 km north of Speyer. Waldsee is the seat of the Verbandsgemeinde ("collective municipality") Rheinauen.

Twin towns – sister cities
Waldsee is twinned with:

  Ruffec, Charente, France (1974)

References

External links
 Official Web site (in German)

Rhein-Pfalz-Kreis